Frenz is a surname. Notable people with the surname include:

 Horst Frenz (1912–1990), German-American literary scholar and professor
 Richardt Frenz (born 1992), South African cricketer
 Ron Frenz (born 1960), American comic book artist
 Uwe Frenz (born 1969), German judoka

See also
 The Frenz Experiment, a 1988 album by The Fall

German-language surnames